Desire is a 1921 silent film directed by F. W. Murnau and starring Conrad Veidt. It tells the story of a male dancer who falls in love with a grand duchess, only to be arrested, and his subsequent attempt to find the duchess.

, it is believed to be a lost film as no prints are known to exist. Robert Neppach worked as the film's art director.

Plot
A young student from Russia (Conrad Veidt) is studying (art or dancing, records of the film are unclear) in Geneva, Switzerland. He wants to go home for a visit, but has no funds. A group of Nihilists need someone to go to Russia for some plot (that plot is not clear, as the film has been lost). The student allows himself to be recruited as their agent, and he goes to Russia.

In Russia, the student meets a young, beautiful Grand Duchess (Gussy Holl), and they fall in love. The student attempts to complete his plot, but is arrested. After some time in prison, he escapes and begins searching for his lost lover. After some time, he discovers she died while he was in prison.

Cast

See also 
List of lost films

References

External links 

Sehnsucht at SilentEra

1921 films
Films of the Weimar Republic
German silent feature films
Lost German films
Films directed by F. W. Murnau
German black-and-white films